Thomas John Zacchaeus Winnifrith (born January 1968) is a British journalist, share tipster and former fund manager.

Early life
Tom Winnifrith was born in 1968 He studied PPE at the University of Oxford (1987–90), graduating with a lower second degree.

Career
Tom Winnifrith is the founder and editor of the website Shareprophets.com. 
He was at one stage chief executive and founder of former ISDX listed Rivington Street Holdings (RSH) before stepping down in 2011.

He has formerly worked as a financial journalist for Investors Chronicle and the London Evening Standard. Winnifrith was the resident investment expert on the Channel 4 game show Show Me The Money.

Controversy

Winnifrith was expelled from the Liberal Democrat Party by Paddy Ashdown in 1993 for allegedly "pandering to racism". He was subject to an investigation by Metropolitan Police Service at the request of the Attorney General at the time, Sir Nicholas Lyell, and then Shadow Cabinet Minister Jack Straw, which found no wrongdoing.

In September 2017, Winnifrith authored an article that claimed that the FCA would not be shutting down Beaufort Securities. In March 2018, Beaufort Securities was shut down, declared insolvent, and charged with fraud, following a joint FCA, FBI, SEC and DOJ investigation.

His time as CEO of Rivington Street Holdings (RSH) has also come under criticism, including accusations of multiple compliance failures while running a regulated company and acting "ultra vires", attempting to sell an FSA regulated entity without the approval of the RSH board

Personal life
Tom is married to  Ranji Devadason. The journalist and author Christopher Booker was his uncle. Winnifrith’s mother committed suicide in 1976. Tom is a friend of Kelvin Mackenzie and considers him to be his journalistic hero.

References 

1968 births
Living people
British chief executives
British journalists
Alumni of the University of Oxford
British bloggers